Punjab cricket team may refer to:

 Punjab cricket team (India)
 Punjab cricket team (Pakistan)

See also
 Kings XI Punjab, a team in the Indian Premier League
 Southern Punjab cricket team, India